Harsco Corporation is a global industrial company based in Philadelphia, Pennsylvania.  Harsco operates in 30 countries and employs approximately 11,000 people worldwide. The company provides industrial services and engineered products that serve large industries, including steel, railways, and energy.  Harsco's common stock is a component of the S&P SmallCap 600 Index and the Russell 2000 Index.

History 

Harsco was founded in 1853 as The Harrisburg Car Manufacturing Company and became the Harrisburg Steel Corporation in 1935.   Following a series of acquisitions, the company became Harsco Corporation in 1956, forming three divisions: Metals & Minerals, Rail, and Industrial.

By the early 1990s, Harsco products and services covered defense, industrial, commercial, and construction applications, with over 250 manufacturing, reclamation, distribution, and service facilities across 14 countries.

In 2018, Harsco acquired Altek, a UK producer of aluminum processing equipment. In 2019, Harsco Metals & Minerals rebranded to Harsco Environmental, and acquired Clean Earth, a U.S. provider of environmentally sustainable solutions for specialty waste streams.

Harsco currently operates four primary businesses: Clean Earth, Harsco Environmental, Harsco Rail, and Harsco Industrial.

In April 2020, Harsco Corporation acquired the Environmental Solutions business (ESOL) from Stericycle, Inc.

Financial information 
Harsco reported total sales of USD $1.7 billion in fiscal year 2018.

Stock exchanges 
Harsco is traded publicly on NYSE with ticker symbol HSC.

References 

Companies based in Cumberland County, Pennsylvania
Manufacturing companies established in 1853
Companies listed on the New York Stock Exchange